THAP domain-containing protein 3 (THAP3) is a protein that, in Homo sapiens (humans), is encoded by the THAP3 gene. The THAP3 protein is as known as MGC33488, LOC90326, and THAP domain-containing, apoptosis associated protein 3. This protein contains the Thanatos-associated protein (THAP) domain and a host-cell factor 1C binding motif. These domains allow THAP3 to influence a variety of processes, including transcription and neuronal development. THAP3 is ubiquitously expressed in H. sapiens, though expression is highest in the kidneys.

Gene 
The H. sapiens THAP3 gene is a protein-encoding gene that is located on the plus strand of chromosome 1 at cytogenetic location 1p36.31. It is 10,727 base pairs long, spanning from genomic coordinates 6,624,868-6,635,595. It contains 6 exons.

Expression 
In H. sapiens, THAP3 gene is expressed ubiquitously throughout different tissues, and expression is greatest in the kidneys. It has also been determined that expression of THAP3 tends to be slightly higher in organs located in the abdomen and male and female sexual organs, such as the ovaries, testes, prostate, adrenal gland, spleen, liver, and colon, though expression in the kidneys is 1.4-1.5x higher than those organs. THAP3 mRNA is 1.3x. more abundant in H. sapiens fetal brain tissue than in H. sapiens adult kidney tissue.

mRNA 
Transcription of the THAP3 gene can result in 11 different mRNA variants, of which 8 are alternatively spliced and 3 are unspliced. Variant 1 is the predominant variant and encodes THAP3 protein isoform 1.

Protein 

The H. sapiens THAP3 protein is predicted to have a molecular weight of 26.9 kiloDaltons and a pI of 10.26. The amino acid sequence is isoleucine and tyrosine rich and arginine poor. Characteristics domains of H. sapiens are the THAP domain (THAP) and the hell-cell factor 1C binding motif (HCM).

Isoforms 
Due to having 8 alternatively spliced variants, there are 8 THAP3 isoforms.

Structure 
The predicted H. sapiens THAP3 tertiary structure contains a globular region and an alpha helix. The globular region is located near the N-terminus of the sequence and is the structure of the THAP domain. It spans amino acids 4-82. The alpha helix is located from amino acids 186-230 and contains the host-cell factor 1C binding motif.

Regulation

Localization 
THAP3 can be localized in the nucleus or mitochondria of H. sapiens cells.

Post-translation modifications 
The H. sapiens the THAP3 protein has 30 predicted phosphorylation sites, 28 predicted O-β-glycosylation sites, and 11 predicted Yin-Yang sites. Many proteins involved in transcription regulation are influenced by phosphorylation and glycosylation sites, which corroborates THAP3's function.

Homology and evolution

Paralogs 
The H. sapiens THAP3 protein, along with several other proteins, is part of the THAP family of proteins. All of these proteins contain the THAP domain and are, thus, paralogs of H. sapiens THAP3.

Orthologs 

There are approximately 206 orthlologs of H. sapiens THAP3. Orthologs can be found in a variety of taxomonic classes, including mammals, reptiles, amphibians, bony fishes, and cartilaginous fishes. However, there are no orthologs in bacteria, fungi, protists, archaea, plants, invertebrates, or birds. Additionally, not all orders are represented with in a class. For example, in reptiles, orthologs to H. sapiens THAP3 are found in testudines (turtles or tortoises) and not found in crocodilia (crocodiles and alligators) or squamata (lizards and snakes). Similarly, there are only orthologs in apoda within amphibians. There are no orthologs in anura (frogs) or urodela (salamanders).

In closely related organisms, those diverged 0-160 million years ago (MYA), percent similarity of orthologs ranges from 36-82.9%. THAP3 sequences in rodents are the least conserved compared to H. sapiens. Sequences that diverged 319-353 MYA, those moderately related, have 47.2-68.9% similarity to H. sapiens THAP3, and 41.3-54.1% similarity in organisms that are distantly related, diverged 431-464 MYA.

Evolution 
H. sapiens THAP3 has evolved at a rate similar to H. sapiens fibrinogen alpha, which is involved in the immune system.

Protein interactions 
H. sapiens THAP3 interacts with proteins involved in various cellular processes, like transcription regulation and neuronal development. It is also interacts with molecular chaperones during its translation.

Clinical significance 
THAP3 contributes to the presentation of X-linked Dystonia-Parkinsonism, also known as Lubag Syndrome. This disease is a neurodegenerative movement disorder that predominantly affects males of Filipino descent. Symptoms include tremors, bradykinesia, rigidity, postural instability, shuffling gait and dystonia, which typically develops later in life.

References